La Cienega Heights is a neighborhood in the Westside of the city of Los Angeles, California.

Geography
La Cienega Heights is bounded by Cadillac Avenue on the south, La Cienega Boulevard on the east, Sawyer Street on the north and Robertson Boulevard on the west. The area was previously known as Cadillac-Corning.

Adjacent Neighborhoods
Reynier Village to the south, Faircrest Heights to the east, Crestview to the north and Beverlywood to the west.

References

Neighborhoods in Los Angeles
Westside (Los Angeles County)
West Los Angeles